Koželuh is a Czech occupational surname meaning "tanner" (a person who processes animal hides into leather). Notable people with the surname include:

Jan Antonín Koželuh (1738–1814), Bohemian composer
Jan Koželuh (1904–1973), Czech tennis player
Karel Koželuh (1895–1950), Czech tennis, soccer, and ice hockey player of the 1920s and 1930s
Leopold Koželuch (1747–1818), Bohemian composer and teacher of classical music, cousin of Jan Antonín

Czech-language surnames
Occupational surnames